Michel Arcand is a Canadian film editor.

Born in Val-d'Or, Quebec, Arcand has won three Genie Awards for Best Achievement in Editing for the films The Rocket, Léolo and Night Zoo (Un zoo la nuit) and five nominations in the same category as well as other nominations for a Jutra Award and from the Directors Guild of Canada.

External links 
 

Canadian film editors
French Quebecers
Best Editing Genie and Canadian Screen Award winners
People from Val-d'Or
1949 births
Living people